(Hani: Goqjef; formerly known as Kochiu) is a county-level city in Honghe Hani and Yi Autonomous Prefecture, Yunnan Province, China, with 202,000 urban inhabitants (ranked 14th largest city in Yunnan). It is the site of China's largest tin deposits and its main industry is mining.

Location
Gejiu is located on the top of a mountain to the north of the Red River (pinyin Hong He) valley, which flows from Xiangyun, Yunnan, to Vietnam.  To the southwest in this valley is Nansha, which lies directly below the town of Yuanyang.  To the northwest of Gejiu lies Jianshui County, and to the north, Jijie Town, one of its subordinate towns.  Mengzi, the capital city of Honghe prefecture, lies 12 miles east of Gejiu.

Layout
The town is located in a crater-like depression around a lake on top of a mountain.  The main road enters the town from the north through a thin pass.  To the east and west are steep cliffs.  Those to the west are too steep to inhabit, however, extensive new construction along the eastern suburbs has created many new residential areas.

Administrative divisions
Administratively, the County-level City of Gejiu consists of 10 township level units: 
 2 subdistricts :Chengqu (城区街道), which includes the urban district, and Datun (大屯街道);
 7 towns: Xicheng (錫城镇), Shadian (沙甸镇), Jijie (雞街镇), Laochang (老廠镇), Kafang (卡房镇), and Manhao (蔓耗镇);
 2 townships: Jiasha (贾沙乡) and Baohe (保和乡)

History 

Originally, Gejiu was called Gejiuli, which is a small mining settlement in Yunnan Province . Under the Yuan (1206–1368) and Ming (1368–1644) dynasties the mining of silver started.

In the late 17th and 18th centuries, mining in Yunnan boomed, but tin mining in Gejiu did not develop until the second half of the 18th century.

In 1889, Mengzi was opened as a treaty port to serve as a gateway for trade between the Qing Government and what was then French Indochina.

It was not until the French in Vietnam built the Yunnan-Vietnam Railway in 1910 when Gejiu began to develop. One of the main purposes in constructing this railway was to service the mine trading.

During the last years of the Qing dynasty, the mining of tin was organized by the Chinese-owned Gejiu Tin Company, but the company was deficient in capital, technical skill, and managerial efficiency and therefore was replaced by a joint state-private company, Gejiu Tin-Mining Company, under which production boomed.

After the 1911 Revolution, Gejiu was further developed due to its location up in the mountains, surrounded by abundant tin deposits.

A branch line was built from Gejiu to Mengzi between 1915 and 1928 to better serve the transport needs of the tin mine.

By the 1930s, Gejiu tin accounted for 80 percent of the traffic exported on the railway. Tin production is said to have reached 10,000 tons in 1938.

After 1949, the management passed to the state-owned Yunnan Tin-Mining Corporation, which by 1955 had reached and exceeded the pre-war production figures. In addition to the city's tin mine, which remained the chief product, Gejiu had also become a major producer of lead, and a thriving metallurgical industry has been developed. Tin articles made in Gejiu were highly acclaimed in China. Coal for smelting was supplied to the city from nearby Kaiyuan to the north, located on the rail line to Kunming. There is some engineering and chemical production closely allied with Gejiu's metallurgical industries.

Today, Gejiu is a relatively modern prosperous county-level city in Yunnan, with a lakeside setting and with a backdrop of rocky hills.

Landforms 
The city of Gejiu surrounds a lake which, however, was not naturally formed. A turning point in the city's history was when a mining accident occurred sometime in the 1950s, when water welled up through the mines which led to groundwater rising to the surface, and this flooded a large part of the narrow valley that the city was located in. This accident may well have turned out to be a blessing in disguise for Gejiu, as it provided a nice scenic lake right in the city center. An already cramped upland location became even more cramped after this flood, which has resulted in an extremely dense, high-rise center compared to other small Chinese cities that are built on plains. Later, the adjacent area to the flood-caused lake was turned into a park. Today, the town is protected from further flooding by an underground spillway.

Climate
It is a typical subtropical highland climate (Köppen: Cwb), with a low temperature variation but cold for latitude.

Ethnography
The populace is primarily Han Chinese. However, minorities such as the Muslim Hui, Dai from the nearby Red River valley, and Hani from the surrounding mountains (see Yuanyang) are also present.

Economy
In addition to tin reserves, iron and coal are also found in Gejiu.

Welfare
The city is the home of the Gejiu Children's Welfare Institute, an orphanage for Yunnan children.

See also 
 HIV/AIDS in Yunnan

Notes

References

External links 
 
 Gejiu City Official Website

County-level divisions of Honghe Prefecture
Cities in Yunnan